Mike Corbett (born January 31, 1972) is an American ice hockey coach who was previously the head coach at Alabama–Huntsville Chargers from 2013 to 2020. Corbett played junior ice hockey for the Wisconsin Capitols of the United States Hockey League from 1990 until 1992 and college ice hockey at Denver from 1992 until 1997.

After his playing career, he coached the Butte Irish of the junior A America West Hockey League from 1997–2000 and was named the league's Coach of the Year in his first season.  Corbett coached the AWHL's Billings Bulls in 2000–01, before moving to the Sioux Falls Stampede of the USHL in 2001–02.  From 2003 until 2013, he was an assistant coach at Air Force; he was promoted to Associate Head Coach before the 2012–13 season.

Corbett was named UAH's sixth head coach on July 8, 2013.

Head coaching record

References

External links

1972 births
Living people
Sportspeople from Green Bay, Wisconsin
American men's ice hockey defensemen
Ice hockey coaches from Wisconsin
Madison Capitols players
Denver Pioneers men's ice hockey players
United States Hockey League coaches
Air Force Falcons men's ice hockey coaches
Alabama–Huntsville Chargers men's ice hockey coaches
Ice hockey players from Wisconsin